Opaon is a genus of short-horned grasshoppers in the family Acrididae. There are at least four described species in Opaon, found in South America.

Species
These species belong to the genus Opaon:
 Opaon eckhardtae Günther, 1940
 Opaon filicornis Descamps, 1973
 Opaon granulosus Kirby, 1902
 Opaon varicolor (Stål, 1878)

References

External links

 

Acrididae